Despite being the founders of the sport of tennis, Britain has not enjoyed much success in the four Grand Slams; namely the Australian Open, the French Open, Wimbledon, and the US Open. The most recent British winner was Emma Raducanu, who won the 2021 US Open Women's Singles, beating Leylah Fernandez in the final. The last man to win a Grand Slam tournament was Andy Murray, who won Wimbledon in 2016, beating Milos Raonic in the final.

The most successful British tennis player of all time was Fred Perry, who is the only Briton to have won all four Grand Slam tournaments. Angela Mortimer, Ann Haydon-Jones and Virginia Wade each won three of the Grand Slams. Andy Murray is the only British player, apart from Fred Perry, to have reached the final of all four Grand Slams.

This table lists British Grand Slam singles tennis finalists. Competitors normally only competed in their home countries in the early years of the championships, and British players always won the men's tournament at Wimbledon until 1906, and the women's tournament until 1905.

Key
Heavy type means champion 
Light type means losing finalist

Men's singles

Women's singles

See also

 List of US Open women's singles champions
 List of US Open men's singles champions
 List of Australian Open men's singles champions
 List of Australian Open women's singles champions
 List of French Open men's singles champions
 List of French Open women's singles champions
 List of Wimbledon gentlemen's singles champions
 List of Wimbledon ladies' singles champions

References

Tennis
 
Tennis in the United Kingdom
tennis
Lists of tennis players